The canton of Cavaillon is a French administrative division in the department of Vaucluse and region Provence-Alpes-Côte d'Azur.

Composition
At the French canton reorganisation which came into effect in March 2015, the canton was reduced from 6 to 2 communes:
Caumont-sur-Durance : 4,663 inhabitants (2012)
Cavaillon : 25,289 inhabitants (2012)

References

Cavaillon